is a former Japanese football player.

Playing career
Kato was born in Tokyo on December 24, 1969. After graduating from high school, he joined Japan Soccer League (JSL) club Toho Titanium in 1988. He played as regular goalkeeper. In 1991, he moved to JSL club Tokyo Gas and played in 3 seasons. In 1994, he moved to Japan Football League club PJM Futures. In 1995, he moved to newly was promoted to J1 League club, Kashiwa Reysol. Although he played many matches in 1995, his opportunity to play decreased behind Yoichi Doi from 1996. In 1998, he moved to Consadole Sapporo. However he could hardly play in the match behind Dido Havenaar and Yohei Sato. In 2000, he moved to Sanfrecce Hiroshima. However he could hardly play in the match behind Takashi Shimoda. In May 2002, he moved to Japan Football League (JFL) club Sagawa Express Tokyo. He played many matches in 3 seasons. In 2005, he moved to Regional Leagues club Rosso Kumamoto (later Roasso Kumamoto). He played many matches in 2005 and the club was promoted to JFL from 2006. He also served a goalkeeper coach from 2006 and the club was promoted to J2 League end of 2007 season. He retired from playing career end of 2007 season. On April 18, 2014, he came back as player because multiple goalkeepers were injured. However he did not play in the match and his registration was deleted on April 25.

Coaching career
In 2006, when Kato played for Rosso Kumamoto (later Roasso Kumamoto), he became a goalkeeper coach for the club. He coached until end of 2014 season. In 2015, he moved to JFA Academy Fukushima LSC and became a goalkeeper coach.

Club statistics

References

External links

Roasso Kumamoto
biglobe.ne.jp

1969 births
Living people
Association football people from Tokyo
Japanese footballers
Japan Soccer League players
J1 League players
J2 League players
Japan Football League (1992–1998) players
Japan Football League players
Toho Titanium SC players
FC Tokyo players
Sagan Tosu players
Kashiwa Reysol players
Hokkaido Consadole Sapporo players
Sanfrecce Hiroshima players
Sagawa Shiga FC players
Roasso Kumamoto players
Association football goalkeepers